Robert Eyre (1666–1735) was an English lawyer, Solicitor-General, Chief Justice of the Common Pleas.

Robert Eyre may also refer to:
Robert Eyre (by 1518 – 1570 or later), MP for Weymouth and Salisbury
Robert Eyre (died 1559), MP for Great Yarmouth
Robert William Eyre, English footballer